The Fairy Stakes (Japanese フェアリーステークス) is a Grade 3 horse race for three-year-old Thoroughbred fillies run in January over a distance of 1600 metres at Nakayama Racecourse.

The race was first run in 1984 and has been run as a Grade 3 level ever since. It was run over 1200 metres as race for two-year-olds in December until the distance and age specification were increased in 2009. The changes meant that the race was not run in 2008.

Winners since 2000

Earlier winners

 1984 - Erebus
 1985 - Majiro Ramonu
 1986 - Kosei
 1987 - Shino Cross
 1988 - Cutting Edge
 1989 - Yamatake Sally
 1990 - Blue Bay Bridge
 1991 - Disco Hall
 1992 - Mother Tosho
 1993 - Nagara Flash
 1994 - Prime Stages
 1995 - Max Rose
 1996 - Hishi Nile
 1997 - Lady Stella
 1998 - Tayasu Bloom
 1999 - Berg Ticket

See also
 Horse racing in Japan
 List of Japanese flat horse races

References

Turf races in Japan